MY MALL Limassol is a shopping centre in Zakaki, a western suburb of Limassol, Cyprus. It is the third biggest mall in size in Cyprus. The mall was originally named "Tiffany Mall", but the name was changed in 2009 following complaints from other holders of the rights to the Tiffany name.

Facilities
This mall hosts a number of retail stores.

The mall contains an ice rink, a bowling alley, an arcade, 6D Cinema and a small play area, located in the lower level of the mall. 

A food court is located on the first floor of the mall with two restaurants and a selection of fast food takeaways.

Transportation
A "Shuttle Bus" service runs between the mall and major hotels in Limassol.  

EMEL, the entity responsible of Limassol’s bus routes, runs buses from Limassol to the mall (the schedules of which can be found at the mall's website). 

The only other means of getting there is by car. At busy times there is significant risk of traffic congestion. 

A new road had been constructed at the time to link the mall to the Limassol-Paphos-Nicosia Highway, by a dual carriage way, that is primarily intended to serve a nearby industrial estate and the Limassol New Port, to relieve local roads of heavy goods vehicles calling at those locations.

See also
Limassol District
List of shopping malls in Cyprus

References

External links 
 MyMall official website

Buildings and structures in Limassol
Economy of Limassol District
Shopping malls established in 2009